Rex Cunningham (11 January 1924 – 19 November 2015) was a New Zealand rugby league player who represented New Zealand.

Playing career
A halfback, Cunningham played for City and the Mount Albert Lions and represented Auckland. He was first selected for New Zealand to play against the touring Great Britain side in 1946, becoming Kiwi number 291.

He then toured Great Britain with New Zealand in 1947–48. During the tour, he scored a test try in the 7–25 loss to France at Bordeaux.

He played 21 games for New Zealand, including four tests, between 1946 and 1948.

Later years
Cunningham died on 19 November 2015, aged 91.

References

1924 births
2015 deaths
New Zealand rugby league players
New Zealand national rugby league team players
Auckland rugby league team players
Rugby league halfbacks
City Rovers players
Place of birth missing
Mount Albert Lions players